Stuffed mallow is a generic name for meals made of mallow leaves, stuffed with meat (lamb) and rice, or more rarely rice only. Meals are called as Mallow Sarma or Mallow Dolma. 
It is mostly popular in Turkey, Israel, Lebanon, Syria, Palestine but also known in the Balkans, especially in Bosnia and Herzegovina, where it may be served with mashed potatoes and yogurt.

See also
 List of stuffed dishes

References

Arab cuisine
Balkan cuisine
Serbian cuisine
Bosnia and Herzegovina cuisine
Stuffed vegetable dishes
Lebanese cuisine
Turkish cuisine dolmas and sarmas
Israeli cuisine
Syrian cuisine
Levantine cuisine
Palestinian cuisine